The Hyundai Sigma engine is a series of V6 piston engines from Hyundai Motor Company, based on the Mitsubishi 6G7 engine. The Sigma engine family began life with the simple V6 name.

2.5L (G6AV)
The DOHC G6AV (also called the 2.5 D) is the small  version.

Applications
Hyundai Dynasty (1997–2005)
Hyundai Grandeur (LX) (1995–1998)
Hyundai Marcia (1995–1998)

3.0L (G6AT/G6CT)
The DOHC G6AT and G6CT (also called the 3.0 D) both displace . They share the 2.5's  stroke but use a larger  bore.

Applications
 Hyundai Dynasty (1996–2005)
 Hyundai Equus (LZ) (1999–2005)
 Hyundai Galloper (1994–2000)
 Hyundai Grandeur (1989–2005)
 Hyundai Sonata (Y3) (1990–1998)
 Hyundai Starex (A1) (1999–2003)
 Hyundai XG300 (2001)
 Kia Opirus (2003–2006)

3.0L LPG (L6AT)
The L6AT displace . They share the 2.5's  stroke but use a larger  bore.

Applications
 Hyundai Galloper (1998–2003)
 Hyundai Libero (2000–2007)
 Hyundai Starex (A1) (1999–2003)

3.5L (G6AU/G6CU)
The G6AU and G6CU (both also called the 3.5 D ) are the large  versions of the Sigma engine.

The 3.5 D has a cast iron engine block and aluminum DOHC cylinder heads. It uses Multi-port fuel injection, has 4 valves per cylinder, and features forged steel connecting rods. It is designed to run on "regular" unleaded gasoline rather than the premium fuel used in many other high-output V6 engines.

It was introduced with the Kia Sedona minivan in 2001.

Applications
 Hyundai Dynasty (1996–1999)
 Hyundai Equus (LZ) (1999–2005)
 Hyundai Grandeur (1994–1996, 2002–2005)
 Hyundai Santa Fe (SM) (2002–2005)
 Hyundai Terracan (2001–2007)
 Hyundai XG350 (XG) (2002–2005)
 Kia Opirus (2003–2006)
 Kia Sedona (GQ) (2001–2005)
 Kia Sorento (BL) (2003–2006)

See also
 List of Hyundai engines
 Mitsubishi 6G7 engine

Sigma
V6 engines
Gasoline engines by model